In computer programming, an arithmetic shift is a shift operator, sometimes termed a signed shift (though it is not restricted to signed operands).  The two basic types are the arithmetic left shift and the arithmetic right shift. For binary numbers it is a bitwise operation that shifts all of the bits of its operand; every bit in the operand is simply moved a given number of bit positions, and the vacant bit-positions are filled in.  Instead of being filled with all 0s, as in logical shift, when shifting to the right, the leftmost bit (usually the sign bit in signed integer representations) is replicated to fill in all the vacant positions (this is a kind of sign extension).

Some authors prefer the terms sticky right-shift and zero-fill right-shift for arithmetic and logical shifts respectively.

Arithmetic shifts can be useful as efficient ways to perform multiplication or division of signed integers by powers of two. Shifting left by n bits on a signed or unsigned binary number has the effect of multiplying it by 2n. Shifting right by n bits on a two's complement signed binary number has the effect of dividing it by 2n, but it always rounds down (towards negative infinity). This is different from the way rounding is usually done in signed integer division (which rounds towards 0). This discrepancy has led to bugs in a number of compilers.

For example, in the x86 instruction set, the SAR instruction (arithmetic right shift) divides a signed number by a power of two, rounding towards negative infinity. However, the IDIV instruction (signed divide) divides a signed number, rounding towards zero. So a SAR instruction cannot be substituted for an IDIV by power of two instruction nor vice versa.

Formal definition 
The formal definition of an arithmetic shift, from Federal Standard 1037C is that it is:
A shift, applied to the representation of a number in a fixed radix numeration system and in a fixed-point representation system, and in which only the characters representing the fixed-point part of the number are moved. An arithmetic shift is usually equivalent to multiplying the number by a positive or a negative integral power of the radix, except for the effect of any rounding; compare the logical shift with the arithmetic shift, especially in the case of floating-point representation.

An important word in the FS 1073C definition is "usually".

Equivalence of arithmetic and logical left shifts and multiplication 
Arithmetic left shifts are equivalent to multiplication by a (positive, integral) power of the radix (e.g., a multiplication by a power of 2 for binary numbers). Logical left shifts are also equivalent, except multiplication and arithmetic shifts may trigger arithmetic overflow whereas logical shifts do not.

Non-equivalence of arithmetic right shift and division 
However, arithmetic right shifts are major traps for the unwary, specifically in treating rounding of negative integers. For example, in the usual two's complement representation of negative integers, −1 is represented as all 1's. For an 8-bit signed integer this is 1111 1111. An arithmetic right-shift by 1 (or 2, 3, ..., 7) yields 1111 1111 again, which is still −1. This corresponds to rounding down (towards negative infinity), but is not the usual convention for division.

It is frequently stated that arithmetic right shifts are equivalent to division by a (positive, integral) power of the radix (e.g., a division by a power of 2 for binary numbers), and hence that division by a power of the radix can be optimized by implementing it as an arithmetic right shift.  (A shifter is much simpler than a divider.  On most processors, shift instructions will execute faster than division instructions.) Large number of 1960s and 1970s programming handbooks, manuals, and other specifications from companies and institutions such as DEC, IBM, Data General, and ANSI make such incorrect statements .

Logical right shifts are equivalent to division by a power of the radix (usually 2) only for positive or unsigned numbers. Arithmetic right shifts are equivalent to logical right shifts for positive signed numbers. Arithmetic right shifts for negative numbers in N−1's complement (usually two's complement) is roughly equivalent to division by a power of the radix (usually 2), where for odd numbers rounding downwards is applied (not towards 0 as usually expected).

Arithmetic right shifts for negative numbers are equivalent to division using rounding towards 0 in one's complement representation of signed numbers as was used by some historic computers, but this is no longer in general use.

Handling the issue in programming languages 

The (1999) ISO standard for the programming language C defines the right shift operator in terms of divisions by powers of 2. Because of the above-stated non-equivalence, the standard explicitly excludes from that definition the right shifts of signed numbers that have negative values.  It does not specify the behaviour of the right shift operator in such circumstances, but instead requires each individual C compiler to define the behaviour of shifting negative values right.

Applications 
In applications where consistent rounding down is desired, arithmetic right shifts for signed values are useful. An example is in downscaling raster coordinates by a power of two, which maintains even spacing. For example, right shift by 1 sends 0, 1, 2, 3, 4, 5, ... to 0, 0, 1, 1, 2, 2, ..., and −1, −2, −3, −4, ... to −1, −1, −2, −2, ..., maintaining even spacing as −2, −2, −1, −1, 0, 0, 1, 1, 2, 2, ... In contrast, integer division with rounding towards zero sends −1, 0, and 1 all to 0 (3 points instead of 2), yielding −2, −1, −1, 0, 0, 0, 1, 1, 2, 2, ... instead, which is irregular at 0.

Notes

References

Cross-reference

Sources used 

 
 
 
 
 
 

Binary arithmetic
Operators (programming)